Vivian Anderson may also refer to:

 Vivian Anderson (baseball) (born 1921), All-American Girls Professional Baseball League player
 Viv Anderson (Vivian Alexander Anderson, born 1956), English football player and coach
 Vivien Oakland (Vivian Ruth Anderson, 1895–1958), twentieth century American actress

See also
 Anderson (surname)